Spectamen epitheca is a species of sea snail, a marine gastropod mollusk, in the family Solariellidae.

Distribution
This species occurs in New South Wales.

References

Solariellidae